Both the practice and legal recognition of polygamy is illegal in Kyrgyzstan, though the issue has been a hot political topic for several decades. There have been numerous attempts to introduce civil polygamous marriage bills, the most recent being in 2007.

References 

Kyrgyzstan
Society of Kyrgyzstan
Women's rights in Kyrgyzstan